Acacia synoria is a tree or shrub, also known as goodlands wattle, belonging to the genus Acacia and the subgenus Juliflorae that is endemic to a small area of  western Australia.

Description
Like most species of Acacia it has phyllodes rather than true leaves. The light green and terete phyllodes have with delicate brown points. The mostly glabrous phyllodes have eight longitudinal nerves each of which is separated by a distinct, longitudinal groove. It blooms in December producing yellow flowers.

Distribution
It is native to an area in the Wheatbelt region of Western Australia between Yalgoo and Dalwallinu where it is often situated around granite outcrops, alongside creeklines and near gravel pits growing in sandy clay or sandy loam soils.

See also
List of Acacia species

References

synoria
Acacias of Western Australia
Taxa named by Bruce Maslin
Plants described in 2007